Taste the Salt is an album by Daryl Braithwaite released in November 1993. The album reached No. 13 on the Australian ARIA Charts.

Braithwaite undertook the Taste the Salt Tour, nationally from 1 March to 18 April 1994.

Track listing
"In the Distance" (Daryl Braithwaite, Ricky Edwards, Simon Hussey)
"Barren Ground" (Bruce Hornsby, John Hornsby)
"Breakin' the Rules" (Robbie Robertson)
"The World as It Is" (Tina Harris, Daniel O'Brien)
"Wind and Sea" (Ricky Edwards, Daryl Braithwaite)
"Reflection of Me" (P. Bowman, A. McSweeney)
"Look What Your Love Has Done to Me" (John Capek, Marc Jordan)
"Gonna Be Somebody" (John Waite, Jonathan Cain, Anthony Brock)
"Trust Somebody" (Marc Jordan, Richard Page, Patrick Leonard)
"Hundreds of Tears" (Sheryl Crow, Robert Marlette)
"Shout" (Lawrence Maddy, Daryl Braithwaite)

Personnel
 Daryl Braithwaite – vocals
 Stuart Fraser – guitar, bass
 Scott Griffiths – piano, keyboards, string arrangement
 Simon Hussey – keyboards, drum machine, additional drums, producer
 John Watson – drums, percussion
 John Corniola – additional drums

Charts

Singles

Release history

References

1993 albums
Daryl Braithwaite albums